Sculpture is an art magazine, published in Jersey City, NJ, by the International Sculpture Center. Described as "the essential source of information, criticism, and dialogue on all forms of contemporary sculpture internationally," Sculpture is published in print form and digitally six times per year.

Sculpture is indexed in the Art Index and the Bibliography of the History of Art.

History and operations
The magazine was founded by David Furchgott, with the first issue published in 1987.

It is partially supported by a grant from the National Endowment for the Arts.

See also

 List of art magazines
 List of United States magazines

References

External links
 sculpturemagazine.art, the magazine's official website
 sculpture.org, the publishing organization's official website

Year of establishment missing
1987 establishments in Washington, D.C.
Visual arts magazines published in the United States
English-language magazines
Magazines established in 1987
Magazines published in Washington, D.C.
Sculpture
Magazines published in New Jersey